Carel Trichardt (born 4 March 1939), is a South African actor. He is the previous head of the drama department at the University of Pretoria. He gained fame as the voice behind the children's character, Knersis. He also appeared in several films, including Katrina, Kruger Millions and Cavaliers games.

Partial filmography

Cavaliers (1966) - Ben Burgers
Kruger Millions (1967) - Ben Burgers
Oupa for Sale (1968) - Auctioneer (uncredited)
Katrina (1969) - Mr. Brink
Die Vervlakste Tweeling (1969) - The Sergeant
Stop Exchange (1970) - Basie
Pressure Burst (1971) - Dempsey Mans
Diamantendetektiv Dick Donald (1971, TV Series) - Sam Smiley
Sononder (1971) - Colonel
Insident op Paradysstrand (1973)
Seun van die Wildtemmer (1973) - Kurt Leeman (voice, uncredited)
The Voortrekkers (1973) - Piet Uys
Kwikstertjie (1974) - Thys Fourie
Die Afspraak (1974) - Lieut. Roos
 (1975, TV Mini-Series) - Fred
'n Sondag in September (1976) - Henderson
Les Diamants du président (1977, TV Mini-Series)
Flatfoot in Africa (1978) - Captain Miller
Die Eensame Vlug (1979) - Prof. Michal Kellerman
Pour tout l'or du Transvaal (1979, TV Mini-Series) - Van Druiden
Rienie (1982) - Len Stevens
Five Star (1984, TV Series)
Vyfster: Die Slot (1986) - Col. Human
Liewe Hemel, Genis! (1986) - Portuguese
Hellgate (1989) - Lucas Carlyle
The Fourth Reich (1990) - Meyder Leibbrandt
Friends (1993) - Rheinhart
Rhodes (1996, TV Mini-Series) - Paul Kruger
Oh Schuks ... I'm Gatvol! (2004) - Carel, Boer fighter
Catch a Fire (2006) - South African minister
Skin (2008) - the magistrate
Henley-on-Klip (2010) - Busdrywer
Traitors (2012) - Judge Jacobs (not yet issued)
'Everyman's Taxi (2012) - Oom KarelUitvlucht'' (2015) - Joshua (final film role)
"Posbus 1" (2020) - Ben

References

External links
 

South African male film actors
Academic staff of the University of Pretoria
Living people
1939 births
South African male voice actors